Middle Run is a  long 2nd order tributary to White Clay Creek in New Castle County, Delaware, United States.

Variant names
According to the Geographic Names Information System, it has also been known historically as:  
Muddy Run

Course
Middle Run rises on the White Clay Creek divide at the Estates at Corner Ketch in New Castle County, Delaware.  Middle Run then flows south to meet White Clay Creek at Delaplane, Delaware.

Watershed
Middle Run drains  of area, receives about 46.1 in/year of precipitation, has a topographic wetness index of 401.04 and is about 32.8% forested.

See also
List of rivers of Delaware

References 

Rivers of Delaware
Rivers of New Castle County, Delaware
Tributaries of the Christina River
Wild and Scenic Rivers of the United States